The Cocorobó Dam is a dam in the state of Bahia, Brazil.
It provides a reservoir of water for irrigation and drinking in the arid caatinga environment of the Raso da Catarina.
The reservoir covers the ruins of the city of Canudos, scene of the War of Canudos in 1896–97.

Location

The Cocorobó Dam is in the Raso da Catarina region of the driest part of Bahia.
It is in the municipality of Canudos.
The Vaza Barria project, which built the dam, was to irrigate , control floods, support fish farming and supply water to the town of Nova Canudos.
The dam is owned by the Departamento Nacional de Obras Contras as Secas (DNOCS).

The reservoir submerged the ruined city of Canudos, location of the War of Canudos (1896–97).
This was apparently a deliberate effort to erase memories of the suppression of a popular revolt by the republican army in 1896–97.
However, the Canudos State Park, created in 1986 to the south of the dam, preserves key sites of the war. 
The stated purpose of the park is to make it impossible to forget the martyrs led by Antônio Conselheiro.

Reservoir

The dam impounds the Vaza-Barris River.
The river bed in the reservoir is covered by sandy alluvial deposits with pockets of silt.
The shale sub-strata are massive, only moderately fractured and have low permeability.
In September 2014 the reservoir was holding only 20% of capacity after a prolonged drought.

Dam structure

The dam is a fan-shaped earth dam with a sand-clay core, with the slope protected by riprap.
The stony aggregate material and artificial sand were derived from quartzite on the right bank of the river beside the dam.

It is covered in reinforced concrete, and designed to handle .
The water intake structure has a tower and twin tubes with  diameter.
The water intake has twin  diameter tubes coated in reinforced concrete.
It is controlled by two flat sluices upstream and manual control valves downstream.

Construction

Construction began in 1951, directly managed by DNOCS.
Between 1951 and 1966  of landfill was excavated, or 48% of the total.
This was repaired, and instruments installed to monitor the embankment, 
Some cracks appeared, and piezometric pressures were considered high.
However, after further observations and analysis the dam was considered acceptable.

Notes

Sources

Dams in Bahia
Earth-filled dams